The Corporation is a fictional organization appearing in American comic books published by Marvel Comics.

Publication history
The Corporation first appeared in Deadly Hands of Kung Fu #23-24 (April–May 1976), and was created by Bill Mantlo and Gil Kane.

A different version of the same organization first appeared in Captain America #213-214 (September–October 1977) by Jack Kirby.

Fictional organization history
The Corporation was a nationwide criminal-political organization run like a business. The Corporation has employed a large number of operatives in its schemes.

Employees

Leaders
 Senator "Kligger" Stivak
 Curtiss Jackson
 Filippo Ayayla
 Veda
 Karl Malus
 Veil

Agents
 Blue Streak
 Carnation
 Coldfire
 Conquer Lord
 Constrictor
 Contract
 Doctor Faustus
 Jonathan Hemlock
 Kangaroo (Brian Hibbs)
 Manslaughter
 Moonstone (Lloyd Bloch)
 Night Flyer
 Rocketeers
 Stryke
 Troubleshooter
 Vamp/Animus
 Agent 4
 Agent 6
 Agent 7
 Number 12
 Benedict Arnold (aka Sleeper Agent)
 Harry Paul
 Grant Henderson
 Maris Collins
 Jason O’Connor
 Simon Granville
 Tim Wender
 Ainsley Wescott

Former members
 Jim Wilson

References

External links